Aswang is an umbrella term for various shape-shifting evil creatures in Filipino folklore, such as vampires, ghouls, witches, viscera suckers, and transforming human-beast hybrids (usually dogs, cats, pigs). The aswang is the subject of a wide variety of myths, stories, arts, and films, as it is well known throughout the Philippines. Spanish colonists noted that the aswang was the most feared among the mythical creatures of the Philippines, even in the 16th century. Although with no specific motive other than harming others, their behavior can be interpreted as an inversion of the traditional Filipino's values. The aswang is especially popular in southern parts of Luzon, and some parts of Mindanao and Visayas, especially the Visayan province of Capiz.

Historical Accounts 
"The sixth was called silagan, whose office it was, if they saw anyone clothed in white, to tear out his liver and eat it, thus causing his death. This, like the preceding, was in the island of Catanduanes. Let no one, moreover, consider this a fable; because, in Calavan, they tore out in this way through the anus all the intestines of a Spanish notary, who was buried in Calilaya by father Fray Juan de Mérida.

The seventh was called manananggal, and his purpose was to show himself at night to many persons, without his head or entrails. In such wise the devil walked about and carried, or pretended to carry, his head to different places; and, in the morning, returned it to his body—remaining, as before, alive. This seems to be a fable, although the natives affirm that they have seen it, because the devil probably caused them so to believe. This occurred in Catanduanes.

The eighth they called osuang, which is equivalent to 'sorcerer;' they say that they have seen him fly, and that he murdered men and ate their flesh. This was among the Visayas Islands; among the Tagalos these did not exist."

Fr. Juan de Plasencia, Customs of the Tagalogs (1589)

Description and taxonomy 
According to Maximo Ramos, the term "aswang" can be thought of as an aggregate term for a multitude of Filipino supernatural creatures. These creatures can be organized into five categories that parallel creatures from Western traditions. These categories are the vampire, the self-segmenting viscera sucker, the weredog, the witch, and the ghoul.

The vampire 
The vampire aswang disguises itself in the shape of a beautiful woman. It shares its diet of blood with vampires of Western cultures. However, it differs by sucking blood using a proboscis-like tongue, rather than sharpened teeth. Furthermore, aswang do not live in tombs. Some live in forests far from human communities, but the aswang can infiltrate human society by means of marrying into a community, and either slowly draining their husband of blood, or else using it strictly as a hideout and leaving at night to raid other villages, thereby keeping their cover intact. One example of a vampire aswang is the Tagalog mandurugo, said to live in the region of Capiz.

The viscera sucker 
The viscera sucker, also known as manananggal, is said to have a diet of internal organs, or the phlegmatic discharge of the sick. Like the vampire aswang, it consumes its food with its tongue, narrow and tubular, but not pointed like the vampire. By day, it takes the shape of an attractive, light-skinned, and long-haired woman. By night, it grows wings and segments itself, leaving behind its body from the waist downwards. It takes great care to hide its lower half, then flies in searches for victims. It is particularly attracted to the fetuses growing inside pregnant women. Viscera suckers are said to live in domiciles deep in the jungle, if not the trees themselves. But like the vampire aswang, most infiltrate human communities via marriage.

The weredog 
Maximo Ramos refers to this category as the weredog, though the creature does not necessarily transform into a dog. Ramos reasons that the werecreature of a given region is named after their most ferocious creature. As such, for example, Europe has werewolves, India has weretigers, Africa has wereleopards, and Russia has werebears. The  Philippines has no indigenous wolf population, thus making weredog the more appropriate term. Like the previous aswang, the weredog infiltrates villages and turns into a creature by night, around midnight. The creature is most commonly a dog, but a cat or pig is also possible. The weredog then kills and eats people, particularly pregnant women on the road in the night, and do not let their long hair hang loose. (Doing so is said to protect against these aswang.) The weredog is said to develop a taste for human flesh by eating food spat on, or licked, by another weredog. (The same is said of the viscera sucker.) Unlike the previous aswang, the weredog does not infiltrate human communities through marriage, but as a traveler of some sort, such as a peddler or a construction labourer.

The witch 

Witch aswang are characterized by extreme vindictiveness, laying curses upon those who have crossed her by making certain objects, such as rice, bones, or insects, come out of the bodily orifices of the cursed. Witches have eyes that reflect images upside down, as well as elongated irises. They live in the outskirts of towns and villages. Witches in the Philippines are feared, avoided and hated. Witches can become aswang, only if they have certain qualities that follow an aswang already. Then they can become an aswang, and by doing so their powers become stronger, stronger than the other witches as well. If an aswang is caught, they are to be immediately killed without question. Though with witches there is just complete avoidance by the people and people around them regard them with fear. Though if an incident were to happen near the witch's residence, then there is reason to turn to the witch to blame and punish.

The ghoul 
Ghoul aswang are described as humanoid but generally hidden. Their diet consists of human corpses, they are carrion-eaters. Their nails and teeth are sharp and strong to help with the theft and consumption of the corpses. Their diet makes them smell rank and pungent. They gather in trees near cemeteries to exhume and consume the fresh burials.

Behaviour 
Aswang commonly dwell at night in locations such as cemeteries and woods, as their powers are significantly, or sometimes totally, reduced during the daytime. However, despite being described as wild monsters that often live in the wilderness and outskirts of society, aswang are also described as creatures that are capable of living within close proximity of or even within the confines of a village, leading to several reports of aswang attacks within large, populated towns and cities. Their ability to adapt and live within the urban and rural environments populated by humans while still maintaining their feral, monstrous nature is cited as a feature that distinguishes aswang from most other monsters. Aswang also generally have a fear of light. Wakes were often brightly lit to ensure that aswang would not come to the funeral to steal and devour the corpse. They also have a disdain for noise, but rare occasions describe aswang attending noisy parties.

Aswang are traditionally described as one-dimensional monsters and inherently evil by nature with no explicable motives beyond harming and devouring other creatures. Their overtly evil behaviour may be described as an inversion of traditional Filipino values. Traditional aswang have no bias when selecting their prey and will not hesitate to target their own kin: an inversion of the traditional Filipino value of strong kinship and family closeness. Aswang are described to be unclean and favor raw human meat to the food found in traditional Filipino culture. The aswang are also often described to be lewd in behaviour, with female aswang often exposing their genitals to contrast values of traditional modesty.

Countermeasures 
There are several remedies and countermeasures to drive away or slay aswang. The different countermeasures often vary  depending on the cultural and symbolic significance of each tool. Holy objects, spices, salt, ash, the tail of a sting-ray, large crustaceans, vinegar, betel nut chew, and urine are all listed as tools for protection against aswang. The reversal of a ladder leading to the house was also said to be a countermeasure against aswang.

Because aswang were believed to be the cause of miscarriages, countermeasures to drive aswang away and prevent them from prowling during childbirth were developed.  One method is for the husband of the child-bearing wife to remain under the house naked while furiously waving a sword. Sharp sticks or bolos should be inserted between the bamboos of the house floor to prevent aswang from lurking under the house.  Additionally, sick people should not stay in houses with holes and are told not to groan in order not to attract aswang.

There is also a special anti-aswang oil that can be developed. To make this oil, select a particular coconut and watch it grow. Pick it at twilight during a full moon when it is wet and gloomy; the breeze should also be chilly. The coconut should be grated and its juice must be squeezed out. Boil the mixture until it becomes oil. Recite secret prayers and throw all the waste into the ocean so that aswang cannot trace whoever made the oil. Once complete, the oil should be hung at the door of the house; it will boil when an aswang is near.

There are other methods of detecting aswang without the use of the special oil. Scratching noises heard from the ceiling of a house is often a sign of a nearby aswang. Aswang in disguise can be detected by seeing if your reflection in the creature's eye is inverted. Additionally, dogs, cats, and pigs with no tails are said to be aswang in disguise. During holy masses, aswang will also attempt to dodge the blessings.

To kill a witch aswang, a bolo knife can be used to strike the middle of the witch's back; if that area is not struck, the witch can lick its wounds to heal its injuries. After slaying an aswang with a bolo, the bolo must be planted under the ground. Firearms are not advised for killing aswang and it is useless to stab and slash at an aswang while it is in the form of an animal. Magic prayers can be used to make the aswang vulnerable; while it is in this helpless state, its body must be cut into pieces. If the aswang is cut into two pieces, each piece must be separated and taken to opposite river banks.

Origins and influences 
Because of the archipelagic geography of the Philippines, and the primarily oral mode of inheriting and imparting narratives from the past for preservation or didactic purposes, stories about the aswang have evolved and adapted according to the locality in question.

The aswang was born out of Philippine folklore, with stories of this terrifying creature dating back to at least the 16th century, when Spanish explorers created the first written record of the monster. The explorers noted that of all the monsters in their folklore, the aswang was the most feared by native people. 
One of the most famous origins of the term aswang came from the aswang tradition in the Bicol region during the sixteenth century. The Bicolanos believed in the God named Gugurang, who was the good God that acted as the beneficent of their region, the defender and guardian of their homes, and their protector against the evil of the God Asuang. The God Asuang, however, was the evil God and rival, who attempted to always cause harm to Gugurang and found pleasure in doing so. Gugurang was always praised by the Bicolanos, and Asuang shunned and cursed.

However, in another story, Gugurang is portrayed as a fire-wielding God who, if displeased with the humans, would cause Mt. Mayon to erupt. The aswang had no control over the people and became jealous of Gugurang's power. As the aswang begged for Gugurang's fire, Gugurang felt that the aswang was only trying to have fire to win the favor of the people, and the two began to argue for centuries. But the aswang was able to steal fire by turning himself invisible and hiding the fire in a coconut shell. However, the aswang was unable to control the power and caused the entire world to catch flames. Gugurang followed the flames which led him to the aswang and took the fire back. He called the Gods to help him put out the fire with rain and take revenge on the aswang by making thunder and lightning to strike the mountains. The act brought upon all the evils and destruction in the land, which the people had never forgotten the aswang for.

Home of the aswang 
Aswang are most commonly associated with the province of Capiz, which lies on the island of Panay at the Western Visayas region, so much so that Capiz has come to be dubbed as the creature's "hometown". In an April 29, 2019, documentary of Kapuso Mo, Jessica Soho (KMJS), aswang are also allegedly sighted in Himamaylan, Negros Occidental, which also lies at Western Visayas, where several residents have been reportedly terrorized by the appearance of the aswang at night. The KMJS team tried to substantiate the resident's claim by installing cameras to capture the alleged creature, but to no avail.

From the lens of social anthropology, what inspired the legends of the aswang can be traced back to two possible sources: the behaviour of the wildlife within the region, and the prominence of X-linked dystonia parkinsonism within the region.

Wildlife behaviour 
Sounds attributed to the aswang's hunting calls ("tiktik" and "wakwak") are similar to the sounds of nocturnal forest wildlife such as bats  and Philippine flying lemurs (which is locally called kagwang). The sounds they make have resulted in their being hunted, under the suspicions that these creatures are aswang in disguise.

Prominence of X-linked dystonia parkinsonism 
X-linked dystonia parkinsonism (XDP) is a genetic form of dystonia found almost entirely among males of Filipino descent (XDP Canada). It is also known as the Dystonia of Panay, due to the fact that most current cases today can be traced back to a common ancestor in Panay. According to most recent studies, 93% of current cases today are located on Panay Island, with 63% of those being located in Capiz.

Individuals diagnosed with this disease exhibit debilitating symptoms that put them in a "transforming state", which results in their "bod[ies] twisting, tongue[s] protruding from their mouth[s], [and] salivating." With the disorder being endemic to the region for generations, the visible symptoms have been interpreted as a major contribution to the prevalence of narratives surrounding Capiz as the home of the aswang. Individuals afflicted with this disease are branded as aswang and are socially ostracized, which prevent their families from seeking effective medical treatment and forcing them to isolate themselves from the larger community.

Influences in contemporary society 
The folklore of the aswang has been interpreted as having influenced certain idiosyncrasies of the Filipino people. Maximo Ramos, focusing on the ghoul-aspect and viscera-sucker aspect of the aswang, proposes that certain behaviours of modern-day Filipinos can be traced back to older traditions and customs that were geared towards protecting themselves from the aswang. Some of the contemporary behaviours he mentions include:

 The vociferous nature of Filipino gatherings, as compared to the solemn and subdued natures of other ethnic groups. This is most obvious when Filipinos meet with each other in non-Philippine settings.
 The floors aren't swept while the dead is lying in state for sweeping the floor would spread the scent of death around the area, which would attract ghouls.
 A chicken whose jugular vein is cut is tossed down the steps and is allowed to flutter away and die while the dead is carried out of the house. The chicken would serve as a distraction for the ghouls.
 In some parts of Luzon, orphans wear red strips of cloth around their wrists, necks, and waists, since red represents fire, a common countermeasure against ghouls. This can explain why "peasant Filipinos" prefer the red clothing which is seen in their dances and in their costumes. (The ghouls have acute hearing but blurred vision.)
 Widows and widowers do not marry for at least a year after the spouse's death, for the new spouse may be mistaken for the old one. This fact explains the unpopularity of the recently widowed in tradition-bound communities.
 Phrases meant to identify that the speaker is not an aswang, and to announce ones presence to spirits, are still common in the Philippines.
In the 1950s The CIA killed Huks, drained their blood, put puncture marks on their necks, and left their corpses out to scare superstitious Filipino away from the movement.

Portrayals in media

In film 
The aswang have been the focus of Philippine horror and thriller films:

 Some of these films include Maria Labo (2015), Aswang (1992), Corazon: Ang Unang Aswang (2012) and Sa Piling ng Aswang (1999).
 They are also featured in the Shake, Rattle & Roll horror film series: particularly Shake, Rattle & Roll II (1990), Shake, Rattle & Roll 2k5 (2005), Shake, Rattle and Roll 8(2006) and Shake, Rattle & Roll X (2008).

The aswang are also featured in the following Western films:

 Aswang (1994 film) (1994) is an American horror film directed and written Wrye Martin and Barry Poltermann. It is based on the mythical creature that feeds on the unborn in Philippine folklore, though unusually the aswangs in the film are of white American ethnicity , instead of being traditionally Filipino. 
 Surviving Evil (2009) is a British horror film directed and written by Terence Daw. It follows documentary filmmakers who travel to a Philippine island, only to discover that a colony of shape shifting, carnivorous aswang inhabit the island.
 Vampariah (2016) is an American horror film following an elite team of hunters, with a mission to keep the world safe from creatures of the night. However, a fateful encounter with an aswang compromises this mission for one of the members.

In television 

 The aswang are featured as primary antagonists in the ABS-CBN teleserye Juan dela Cruz and its prequel, My Little Juan.
 An aswang is featured in the sixth episode of the Canadian TV show Lost Girl, and is portrayed as a relatively harmless scavenger Fae.
 Mommy Dearest, an episode of the supernatural drama television series Grimm, features an aswang attacking Sergeant Wu's pregnant childhood friend from the Philippines. It features an aswang as a form of wesen that sucks the amniotic fluid out of a pregnant woman's stomach.
 The aswang are partial inspiration for the primary antagonists in FX The strain.
 The aswang are main villains of Trese, acting as a gang of sorts opposing protagonist Alexandra Trese.

In literature 
The aswang appear as a mafia in the comic Trese, a Filipino dark fantasy comic that focuses on supernatural creatures from Philippine folklore. Recently, Trese has been released on Netflix as an anime-influenced streaming television series.
 An aswang character appears in the fourth issue of comedy-horror webcomic Fantastic Crap Comics.
Tikbalang, Aswang, Atbp. B1 Gang Series is a fictional series that follows four children on their supernatural investigations.
The Aswang Inquiry compiles the supernatural researches of Frank Lynch, S.J., and Richard Arend, S.V.D.
 An aswang is the primary antagonist in the Supernatural spin-off novel Supernatural: Fresh Meat.
 "The Aswang Complex in Philippine Folklore" is an academic paper turned book written by Dr. Maximo Rosales. It is a compilation of the various aswang qualities in different regions of the Philippines.
 Aswang (Monsters) and Supernaturalisms: Nocturnal Deities talks of aswang myths, beliefs, and folktales through the lens of the Atimonan townsfolk.
 An aswang is one of the villains in Wicked Embers by Keri Arthur.
 Aswang are the main subjects in Filipino-American author, Jason Tanamor's new novel, Vampires of Portlandia.
 An aswang is described terrorising a remote village in the Philippines in Denis Johnson's National Book Award-winning novel Tree of Smoke.
 A demonic character called "Aswang" is a member of the Diwatas, the Filipino gods of the Marvel Comics universe.
 A murdered young woman with a lineage of unfulfilled ancestors is transformed by death into an aswang who seeks justice in Melissa Chadburn's debut novel, A Tiny Upward Shove.
 In the comic series Trese, the aswang are featured in multiple volumes as antagonists

Other 

 LUNA: An Aswang Romance is a Filipino play about the creature.
Ang Unang Aswang is a stage play that dramatizes the concept of the first aswang came to be.
 In the 2016 survival horror game Nightfall: Escape, "Aswang" is one of the main antagonists. The Filipino horror game also featured similar creatures from Philippine mythology.
 In the 2013 first-person shooter game Shadow Warrior, "Aswang Hunger" is an unlockable ability which allows the player to steal health points from enemies.
 Aswang is a high level notorious monster in the 2017 game Final Fantasy XIV: Stormblood, and is portrayed as a pterosaur.

Further reading

References 

Philippine demons
Philippine legendary creatures
Vampires
Ghouls
Philippine mythology
Shapeshifters
Supernatural legends